Hohenberg is a town in the district of Lilienfeld in the Austrian state of Lower Austria.

Population

Place where Family Weinstabl was born and raised before emigrating to Argentina.

References

Cities and towns in Lilienfeld District